Zhanjiang Sports Centre (Simplified Chinese: 湛江体育中心) is a multi-use stadium in Zhanjiang, China.  It is currently used mostly for football matches. The capacity of this stadium is 20,000.

Footnotes

Football venues in China
Sports venues in Guangdong